Nowshera is a tehsil located in Nowshera District, Khyber Pakhtunkhwa, Pakistan. The population is  727,749 according to the 2017 census.

See also 
 List of tehsils of Khyber Pakhtunkhwa

References 

Tehsils of Khyber Pakhtunkhwa
Populated places in Nowshera District